Sun Chunlan (born 24 May 1950) is a Chinese politician. She served as the second-ranked Vice Premier of the People's Republic of China and the highest-ranking incumbent female government official until March 2023. Previously, she served as a member of the Politburo of the Chinese Communist Party.

Sun served as the party chief of the coastal city of Dalian and as the First Secretary of All-China Federation of Trade Unions. From 2009 to 2014, Sun served in two prominent regional posts, first as Communist Party Secretary of Fujian province, then of Tianjin, one of China's four direct-controlled municipalities. Her tenure in Fujian made her the second female provincial-level party chief since the founding of the People's Republic of China in 1949 (the first was Wan Shaofen). Between 2014 and 2017, she served as head of the United Front Work Department of the Central Committee of the Chinese Communist Party.

Background
Sun was born in May 1950 in Raoyang County, Hebei. After graduating with a degree in mechanics from Anshan Industrial Technology Academy in Liaoning, Sun worked at Anshan Clock Factory, which made watches. There she rose from the shop floor to membership of the factory's CCP branch, which managed the operations of the factory. She joined the Chinese Communist Party in May 1973, during the latter stages of the Cultural Revolution. She was then transferred to the Anshan Textiles Factory to work as a manager. In 1988 she became the chair of the women's federation of Anshan.

In 1990, Sun was transferred to work in the organs reporting directly to the provincial party leadership, paving the way for further career advancement.  In 1994 she became head of the provincial trade union federation, a year later she began sitting on the Liaoning provincial Party Standing Committee; achieving such a feat at age 45 was rare.  In 1997, Sun was named deputy party chief of Liaoning and president of the provincial party school.  In 2001, the party chief of the bustling coastal city of Dalian departed the city to become the governor of Liaoning. Sun was then confirmed as party chief of Dalian with party committee members unanimously confirming her nomination. She served in the post from 2001 to 2005, before being transferred to work in Beijing.  Sun was named the Vice-Chair of the All-China Federation of Trade Unions at the Third Session of the 14th ACFTU Executive Committee, and then the First Secretary of the ACFTU Secretariat at the Eighth Session of the 14th ACFTU Presidium In December 2005.

Party Secretary and national leadership
In a December 2009 re-shuffle, Sun Chunlan was named party boss of Fujian Province, the first female to take such a high-level secretaryship since Wan Shaofen, Party Secretary of Jiangxi in the 1980s.  Provincial party chief positions are of special significance and are some of the most powerful positions of the land; that Sun assumed a bona fide "power position" was not only rare for a woman, but also made her well positioned for further advancement.

After the 18th Party Congress held in November 2012, Sun became the party chief of Tianjin municipality, China's richest provincial-level jurisdiction by GDP at the time, taking the post vacated by Zhang Gaoli, who became a member of the Politburo Standing Committee. As Party Secretary of Tianjin, Sun joined the elite ranks of the Politburo of the Chinese Communist Party as one of the two women on the body (the other was Vice-Premier Liu Yandong). She additionally became the first female party chief of a direct-controlled municipality in party history.

After the investigation and dismissal of former Hu Jintao aide Ling Jihua as head of the Communist Party's United Front Work Department, Sun was named as head of the department on December 31, 2014. Sun was the first United Front chief to hold a concurrent Politburo seat since Ding Guangen. Her post in Tianjin was succeeded on an interim basis by Mayor Huang Xingguo. Since Sun ascended to the United Front chief position, Xi Jinping has taken on a new datongzhan (大统战) strategy for United Front work, expanding the scope of the United Front Work Department. In 2015, Wang Zhengwei, Vice-Chairman of the Chinese People's Political Consultative Conference, was named deputy head of the department, assisting Sun, creating a unique situation where two of the top leaders of the United Front were held by "deputy national leader" ranked figures.

In March 2018, Sun was appointed as the Vice Premier of the People's Republic of China.

Sun is a member of the 19th Politburo of the Chinese Communist Party. She was also an alternate member of the 15th and 16th Central Committees of the Chinese Communist Party, and a full member of the 17th, 18th and 19th Central Committees.

She was awarded the Gold Olympic Order after the 2022 Winter Olympics for her responsibility for the anti-COVID management of the Olympic Winter Games.

In 2022, Sun Chunlan was selected as one of the Time 100.

References

External links 

 

1950 births
Living people
People's Republic of China politicians from Hebei
Chinese Communist Party politicians from Hebei
Politicians from Hengshui
Political office-holders in Liaoning
Political office-holders in Fujian
Members of the 18th Politburo of the Chinese Communist Party
Members of the 17th Central Committee of the Chinese Communist Party
Alternate members of the 16th Central Committee of the Chinese Communist Party
Alternate members of the 15th Central Committee of the Chinese Communist Party
Members of the 19th Politburo of the Chinese Communist Party
21st-century Chinese women politicians
21st-century Chinese politicians
Recipients of the Olympic Order